Marie Desplechin (born Roubaix, Nord, 7 January 1959) is a French writer. She studied literature and journalism before becoming a writer. She is the author of several children's novels and Taking it to Heart, a collection of short stories. Sans Moi, her first novel, has been a great success in France, where it has sold over 120,000 copies. She won the Prix Médicis in 2005 for her book, La vie sauve.

References 

 
 
 

1959 births
Living people
People from Roubaix
French women novelists
Prix Médicis essai winners